Foreign relations exist between Bahrain and Turkey. Turkey's historic relationship with Bahrain has wavered between indifference and courtship, but the constant has been a layer of mistrust emanating from both ends that appears to have been set aside in 2002 when the new Turkish government reversed the status quo and embraced a policy of engagement that has successfully catapulted the country to becoming a leading economic player in the Bahrain.

Turkey opened its Embassy in Bahrain in 1990, while the Embassy of the Kingdom of Bahrain in Ankara has been in operation since 2008.

Diplomatic Visits

Economic and Trade Relations 

Turkey mainly exports tobacco and its products, iron and steel, motor vehicles and their parts to Bahrain. On the other hand, Bahrain mainly exports aluminium, iron, petroleum products (except for petroleum and its derivatives) chemical fertilizers, cotton products to Turkey. Trade volume between the two countries was 486 million USD in 2018 (Turkish exports/imports: 299/187 million USD).

Cultural Relations 

Turkish television drama have become massively popular across in Bahrain, as millions of Arabs stop everything daily to view the latest episode of shows such as Hareem Al Sultan and Fatima, going a long way to promote a positive image of Turkey in Bahrain.

Turkish-Bahraini Business Council 
The Turkish-Bahraini Business Council was established based on the agreement signed by the Union of Chambers and Commodity Exchanges of Turkey (TOBB) and Bahrain Chamber of Commerce and Industry (BCCI) on 16 February 2006 in Istanbul. The first joint meeting of the board of directors of the Council was convened on the same day, whereas the last meeting of the Council was held on 1 March 2017 in Ankara, just before the JEC meeting (held on 2-3 March 2017).

See also 

 Foreign relations of Bahrain
 Foreign relations of Turkey

References 

Bahrain–Turkey relations
Turkey
Bilateral relations of Turkey